Kashipur Junction railway station is a small railway station in Udham Singh Nagar district, Uttarakhand. Its code is KPV. It serves Kashipur town. The station consists of three platforms. The platform is well sheltered. It is good and beautiful and has good sanitation and water which many Indian Railway Stations lacks.

References

External links

Railway stations in Udham Singh Nagar district
Izzatnagar railway division
Kashipur, Uttarakhand
Railway junction stations in Uttarakhand